Thomas Aloyisus Kennedy (July 15, 1885 – October 6, 1965) was an American actor known for his roles in Hollywood comedies from the silent days, with such producers as Mack Sennett and Hal Roach, mainly supporting lead comedians such as the Marx Brothers, W. C. Fields, Mabel Normand, Shemp Howard, Laurel and Hardy, and the Three Stooges. Kennedy also played dramatic roles as a supporting actor.

Career

For over 50 years, from 1915 to 1965, he appeared in over 320 films and television series, often uncredited. His first film was a short black and white comedy His Luckless Love. He was in all nine Torchy Blane films as Gahagan, the poetry-spouting cop whose running line was, "What a day! What a day!" He continued making films right up until his death, his last film being a Western titled The Bounty Killer (1965).

Tom Kennedy has been erroneously listed in several film sources as the brother of slow-burning comedian Edgar Kennedy. Though the two men were not related, they were apparently good friends, with Tom appearing in many of Edgar's domestic two-reel comedy shorts.

Kennedy was also paired with Stooge Shemp Howard for several shorts for Columbia Pictures such as Society Mugs, as well as appearing with the Three Stooges in the films Loose Loot and Spooks!. He was also paired with El Brendel for four shorts, such as Phoney Cronies in 1942.

His television appearances included episodes of Perry Mason, Maverick, My Favorite Martian and Gunsmoke.

Personal life
Kennedy married to Frances Katherine Marshall in 1922, they had four children.

Death
Kennedy died of bone cancer on October 6, 1965. He was buried at the Hollywood Forever Cemetery in Hollywood, California.

Selected filmography

 The Lamb (1915) as White Hopeless (uncredited)
 Double Trouble (1915) as Judge Blodgett
 Mickey (1918) as Tom Rawlings
 Yankee Doodle in Berlin (1919) as American General (uncredited)
 The Island of Intrigue (1919) as Jackson - The Butler
 The Poor Simp (1920) as Jim Donnelly
 Kismet (1920) as Kutayt
 Skirts (1921)
 Serenade (1921) as Zambrano
 Kindred of the Dust (1922) as Big tough (uncredited)
 Our Leading Citizen (1922) as Boots
 If You Believe It, It's So (1922) as Bartender
 Afraid to Fight (1922) as Battling Grogan
 The Flaming Hour (1922) as Ben
 The Flirt (1922) as Sam Fenton
 With Naked Fists (1923)
 Scaramouche (1923) as A Dragoon (uncredited)
 Madonna of the Streets (1924)
 As Man Desires (1925) as Gorilla Bagsley
The Fearless Lover (1925) as Tom Dugan
 High and Handsome (1925) as Bat Kennedy
 The Best Bad Man (1925) as Dan Ellis
 The Yankee Señor (1926) as Luke Martin
 Behind the Front (1926) as Sergeant
 Sir Lumberjack (1926) as Bill Blake
 Born to the West (1926) as Dinkey Hooley
 Mantrap (1926) as Curly Evans
 The Better 'Ole (1926) as The Blacksmith (uncredited)
 We're in the Navy Now (1926) as Sailor Percival Scruggs
 Man of the Forest (1926) as Sheriff
 The Mysterious Rider (1927) as Lem Spooner
 Señorita (1927) as Oliveros Gaucho (uncredited)
 Alias the Deacon (1927) as 'Bull' Moran
 Fireman, Save My Child (1927) as Capt. Kennedy
 One-Round Hogan (1927) (uncredited)
 Silver Valley (1927) as 'Hayfever' Hawkins
 Ham and Eggs at the Front (1927) as Lazarus
 Wife Savers (1928) as General Lavoris
 Tillie's Punctured Romance (1928) as Property Man
 Hold 'Em Yale (1928) as Detective
 None but the Brave (1928) as Noah
 The Cop (1928) as Sergeant Coughlin
 Marked Money (1928) as Bill Clemons
 Love Over Night (1928) as Detective
 The Cohens and Kellys in Atlantic City (1929) as Crook
 Glad Rag Doll (1929) as Manager
 Big News (1929) as Officer Ryan
 Happy Days (1929) as Doorman (uncredited)
 The Shannons of Broadway (1929) as Burt
 The Big House (1930) as Uncle Jed (scenes deleted)
 The Fall Guy (1930) as Detective Burke
 See America Thirst (1930) as 'Shivering' Smith
 The Gang Buster (1931) as 'Gopher' Brant
 Sit Tight (1931) as Mr. Mack (uncredited)
 It Pays to Advertise (1931) as Perkins
 Iron Man (1931) as Bartender (uncredited)
 El Tenorio del harem (1931) as El sargento
 Young as You Feel (1931) as Colorado Detective (uncredited)
 Caught (1931) as Jard Harmon
 Monkey Business (1931) as Gibson
 New Adventures of Get Rich Quick Wallingford (1931) as Truck Driver (uncredited)
 Flying High (1931) as Jokester with Firecrackers (uncredited)
 Charlie Chan's Chance (1932) as Hawkins, Man in Police Line-Up (uncredited)
 Huddle (1932) as Moving Man (uncredited)
 Lady and Gent (1932) as Small Arena Fighter Spider Webb
 Skyscraper Souls (1932) as Masseur (uncredited)
 Pack Up Your Troubles (1932) as Recruiting Sergeant
 The Crooked Circle (1932) as Mike, the policeman
 Night After Night (1932) as Tom (the bartender)
 Madison Square Garden (1932) as Judge (uncredited)
 If I Had a Million (1932) as Joe - Carnival Bouncer (uncredited)
 Uptown New York (1932) as Wrestling Trainer (uncredited)
 The Devil Is Driving (1932) as Fritz (uncredited)
 Lawyer Man (1932) as Jake - the Ice Man (uncredited)
 She Done Him Wrong (1933) as Big Bill - Bartender (uncredited)
 42nd Street (1933) as Slim Murphy (uncredited)
 Blondie Johnson (1933) as Hype (uncredited)
 Song of the Eagle (1933) as Officer McGinty (uncredited)
 Cross Fire (1933) as French Bouncer (uncredited)
 Man of the Forest (1933) as Sheriff Blake
 Penthouse (1933) as Joe - Gazotti's Man (uncredited)
 Bombshell (1933) as Minor Role (scenes deleted)
 Day of Reckoning (1933) as Phil - First Piano Mover (uncredited)
 Strictly Dynamite (1934) as Junior
 Hollywood Party (1934) as Beavers (uncredited)
 Down to Their Last Yacht (1934) as Joe 'Uncle Ed' Schultz (uncredited)
 Bright Lights (1935) as Traffic Cop at Theatre (uncredited)
 Old Man Rhythm (1935) as Campus Guard (uncredited)
 She Couldn't Take It (1935) as Slugs (uncredited)
 The Bride Comes Home (1935) as Husky Thug at Party (uncredited)
 The Country Doctor (1936) as Logger (uncredited)
 Poppy (1936) as Hot Dog Stand Proprietor (uncredited)
 The Return of Sophie Lang (1936) as Cop on Switchboard (uncredited)
 Ticket to Paradise (1936) as Cop (uncredited)
 Hollywood Boulevard (1936) as Bouncer at Pago Pago
 Bulldog Edition (1936) as Irate Husband of Contest Loser (uncredited)
 Wives Never Know (1936) as Bartender (uncredited)
 The Big Game (1936) as Fan in Stands (uncredited)
 Smart Blonde (1937) as Gahagan
 Woman-Wise (1937) as Bouncer (uncredited)
 When's Your Birthday? (1937) as Fight Manager (uncredited)
 Behind the Headlines (1937) as Tiny
 There Goes My Girl (1937) (scenes deleted)
 Armored Car (1937) as Tiny
 The Case of the Stuttering Bishop (1937) as Jim Magooney
 Slave Ship (1937) as Bartender (uncredited)
 Married Before Breakfast (1937) as Mr. Baglipp
 Fly-Away Baby (1937) as Gahagan
 She Had to Eat (1937) as Pete
 Marry the Girl (1937) as Jasper
 The Big Shot (1937) as Bugs
 Forty Naughty Girls (1937) as Detective Casey
 Varsity Show (1937) as Policeman (uncredited)
 Living on Love (1937) as Pete Ryan
 The Adventurous Blonde (1937) as Gahagan
 Wise Girl (1937) as Detective
 Crashing Hollywood (1938) as Al
 Swing It, Sailor! (1938) as Policeman
 Blondes at Work (1938) as Gahagan
 Making the Headlines (1938) as Police Sergeant Handley
 He Couldn't Say No (1938) as Dimples, a Gangster
 Torchy Blane in Panama (1938) as Gahagan
 Go Chase Yourself (1938) as Icebox
 Danger on the Air (1938) as Hotel Doorman (uncredited)
 Crime Ring (1938) as Dummy (uncredited)
 Torchy Gets Her Man (1938) as Gahagan
 Long Shot (1939) as Mike Claurens
 Torchy Blane in Chinatown (1939) as Gahagan
 Pardon Our Nerve (1939) as Bodyguard
 Society Lawyer (1939) as Alf
 Torchy Runs for Mayor (1939) as Gahagan
 Grand Jury Secrets (1939) as Clancy (uncredited)
 Torchy Blane... Playing with Dynamite (1939) as Gahagan
 These Glamour Girls (1939) as Joy Lane Manager (uncredited)
 The Day the Bookies Wept (1939) as Pinky Brophy
 The Covered Trailer (1939) as Otto
 Remember the Night (1940) as 'Fat' Mike
 Millionaire Playboy (1940) as Tom Murphy
 Curtain Call (1940) as Massage Attendant
 An Angel from Texas (1940) as Chopper
 Pop Always Pays (1940) as Murphy
 Sporting Blood (1940) as Grantly
 Flowing Gold (1940) as Petunia
 Mexican Spitfire Out West (1940) as Taxi Driver
 Footlight Fever (1941) as Pinky (uncredited)
 The Great Swindle (1941) as Capper Smith
 Thieves Fall Out (1941) as Cab Driver (uncredited)
 Angels with Broken Wings (1941) as Gus
 Sailors on Leave (1941) as Dugan
 The Officer and the Lady (1941) as Bumps O'Neil
 The Mexican Spitfire's Baby (1941) as Sheriff Judson (uncredited)
 Pardon My Stripes (1942) as Casino
 Butch Minds the Baby (1942) as Philly the Weeper
 Broadway (1942) as Kerry (uncredited)
 Blondie's Blessed Event (1942) as Motorcycle Cop Who Names The Baby 'Cookie' (uncredited)
 Wildcat (1942) as Fred (uncredited)
 Mexican Spitfire's Elephant (1942) as Joe the Villa Luigi Bartender (uncredited)
 Dixie Dugan (1943) as Sergeant (uncredited)
 Ladies' Day (1943) as Dugan, the House Detective
 Hit Parade of 1943 (1943) as Westinghouse
 Taxi, Mister (1943) as Detective (uncredited)
 Dixie (1943) as Barkeeper (uncredited)
 Stage Door Canteen (1943) as himself
 Petticoat Larceny (1943) as Pinky
 The Adventures of a Rookie (1943) as Ship Lader (uncredited)
 So's Your Uncle (1943) as Cop
 Is Everybody Happy? (1943) as Desk Sergeant (uncredited)
 Riding High (1943) as Wilson (uncredited)
 Here Comes Elmer (1943) as Johnson
 Campus Rhythm (1943) as Police Sergeant (uncredited)
 True to Life (1943) as Customer (uncredited)
 O, My Darling Clementine (1943) as Bill Collector
 Rosie the Riveter (1944) as Piano Mover
 The Girl in the Case (1944) as Watchman (uncredited)
 And the Angels Sing (1944) as Potatoes
 Once Upon a Time (1944) as Truckman (uncredited)
 Take It Big (1944) as Moving Man (uncredited)
 Moonlight and Cactus (1944) as Lucky
 The Princess and the Pirate (1944) as Alonzo
 The Town Went Wild (1944) as Policeman in Courtroom (uncredited)
 Practically Yours (1944) as Burly Citizen at Newsreel Theatre (uncredited)
 The Man Who Walked Alone (1945) as Officer #1
 Rough, Tough and Ready (1945) as Dan Cowan (uncredited)
 Boston Blackie's Rendezvous (1945) as Doorman (uncredited)
 Voice of the Whistler (1945) as Ferdinand / Hammerlock
 The Spanish Main (1945) as Pirate Captain at Inn in Tortuga (uncredited)
 Man Alive (1945) as Bartender (uncredited)
 A Letter for Evie (1946) as Driver (uncredited)
 The Kid from Brooklyn (1946) as Referee #1 (uncredited)
 Blonde Alibi (1946) as Policeman Clancy (uncredited)
 Bringing Up Father (1946) as Murphy
 The Mighty McGurk (1947) as Bruiser (uncredited)
 The Pretender (1947) as Fingers Murdock
 The Burning Cross (1947) as Police Sergeant
 Magic Town (1947) as Moving Man (uncredited)
 Dangerous Years (1947) as Adamson
 The Judge Steps Out (1948) as Jack, the Court Receptionist (uncredited)
 Devil's Cargo (1948) as Naga
 Jinx Money (1948) as Officer Rooney
 They Live by Night (1948) as Cop (uncredited)
 Joe Palooka in Winner Take All (1948) as Lefty
 Thunder in the Pines (1948) as Josh - Station Master
 Jiggs and Maggie in Court (1948) as Card Player (uncredited)
 The Paleface (1948) as Bartender
 Trouble Preferred (1948) as Night Watchman (uncredited)
 Fighting Fools (1949) as Rosemeyer, Arena Doorman (uncredited)
 The Mutineers (1949) as Butch
 Mighty Joe Young (1949) as Policeman (uncredited)
 Jiggs and Maggie in Jackpot Jitters (1949) as Murphy (uncredited)
 Square Dance Jubilee (1949) as Bartender Tom
 Blonde Dynamite (1950) as Tom, a Policeman (uncredited)
 Riding High (1950) as Racetrack Mug (uncredited)
 Jiggs and Maggie Out West (1950) as Murphy (uncredited)
 Triple Trouble (1950) as Convict (uncredited)
 Border Rangers (1950) as Station Agent
 M (1951) as Hood (uncredited)
 The Scarf (1951) as Asylum Inmate (uncredited)
 Let's Go Navy! (1951) as Officer Donovan
 Havana Rose (1951) as Hotel Detective
 Hold That Line (1952) as Officer Murphy (uncredited)
 Road Agent (1952) as Bartender Johnny (uncredited)
 Gold Fever (1952) as Big Tom
 Invasion U.S.A. (1952) as Tim, Bartender
 Abbott and Costello Meet the Keystone Kops (1955) 
 Public Pigeon No. 1 (1957) as Prison Guard (uncredited)
 The Kettles on Old MacDonald's Farm (1957) as Contest Spectator (uncredited)
 Man of a Thousand Faces (1957) as Audience at Eulogy (uncredited)
 Slaughter on Tenth Avenue (1957) as Dock Guard (uncredited)
 Once Upon a Horse... (1958) as Townsman (uncredited)
 Revolt in the Big House (1958) as Convict (uncredited)
 Some Like it Hot (1959) as Bouncer (uncredited)
 Say One for Me (1959) as Wardrobe Delivery Man (uncredited)
 Walk Like a Dragon (1960) as Jethro the Bartender
 It's a Mad, Mad, Mad, Mad World (1963) as Santa Rosita Police Department traffic cop (uncredited)
 The Bounty Killer (1965) as Joe - Waiter

References

External links

 
 
 

1885 births
1965 deaths
Deaths from bone cancer
American male silent film actors
Deaths from cancer in California
Male actors from New York City
20th-century American male actors
Burials at Hollywood Forever Cemetery
20th-century American comedians